Sisters Eagle Airport  is a public airport located one mile (1.6 km) north of Sisters in Deschutes County, Oregon, USA.  There are some subdivisions with direct access to the airport. It is also used for wildfire aircraft support.

External links

Oregon Department of Aviation
Fltplan

Airports in Deschutes County, Oregon
Sisters, Oregon